Roberto is a variation of the name Robert.

Roberto may also refer to:

Name

Given name
 Roberto (footballer, born 1912)
 Roberto (footballer, born 1977)
 Roberto (footballer, born 1978)
 Roberto (footballer, born 1979)
 Roberto (footballer, born 1988)
 Roberto (footballer, born January 1990)
 Roberto (footballer, born December 1990)
 Roberto (footballer, born 1998)
 Roberto Baggio (born 1967), Italian footballer
 Roberto Carlos (born 1973), Brazilian former footballer
 Roberto Clemente (1934–1972), Puerto Rican baseball player
 Roberto Del Castello (born 1957), Italian auto racing driver
 Roberto Di Matteo (born 1970), Italian football manager and former footballer 
 Roberto Durán (born 1951), Panamanian former boxer
 Roberto Firmino (born 1991), Brazilian footballer
 Roberto Hernández (disambiguation), multiple people
 Roberto Mancini (born 1964), Italian football manager and former footballer
 Roberto Mazzotta (born 1940), Italian economist and politician 
 Roberto Merhi (born 1991), Spanish auto racing driver
 Roberto Miranda (born 1944), Brazilian former footballer
 Roberto Moreno (born 1959), Brazilian auto racing driver
 Roberto Osuna (born 1995), Mexican baseball player
 Roberto Jiménez (footballer, born 1986), Spanish footballer
 Roberto Lavagna (born 1942), Argentine economist and politician
 Roberto Luongo (born 1979), Canadian ice hockey player
 Roberto Rodrigo (born 1988), Portuguese footballer
 Roberto Rossellini (1906–1977), Italian film director
 Roberto Soldado (born 1985), Spanish footballer
 Roberto Tremelloni (1900–1987), Italian economist and politician
 Roberto De Vito (1867–1959), Italian jurist and politician 
 Roberto Xalino (born 1987), Cape Verdean musician
 Roberto Zanetti (born 1956), Italian musician, also knows as "Savage" or "Robyx"

Surname
 Zé Roberto (born 1974), a Brazilian former footballer
 Holden Roberto (1923–2007), an Angolan political figure
 Venancio Roberto (fl. 1898–1899), leader of a short attempted coup in Guam

Other uses
 Roberto (horse) (1969–1988), an American-bred, Irish-trained Thoroughbred Champion racehorse
 Roberto (Futurama), a fictional criminally insane, psychotic robot in the cartoon Futurama
 Roberto (Passions), a fictional minor character on the soap opera, Passions
 Roberto (Open Season 2), a fictional minor character in the Open Season cartoon film series
 Roberto: The Insect Architect a picture book published in 2000 by Nina Laden

See also

Zé Roberto (disambiguation)
Robert (disambiguation)
Berto (disambiguation)
Roberta (disambiguation)
Roberton (disambiguation)